In the mythology of Mangaia in the Cook Islands, the Tapairu are elves or fairies, who are named after the four daughters of Miru, the deformed goddess of the underworld. They were said to have been present when mortals danced in honor of their brother, Tau-Titi. They were also associated with the god Tane.

References
R.D. Craig, Dictionary of Polynesian Mythology (Greenwood Press: New York, 1989), 33–34; 
W.W. Gill, Myths and Songs of the South Pacific (H.S. King: London, 1876), 256–7.

Mangaia mythology
Polynesian legendary creatures